Sérandon is a commune in the Corrèze department in central France.

Geography
The Triouzoune forms the commune's western boundary, then flows into the Dordogne, which forms the commune's southeastern and eastern boundaries.

Population

See also
Communes of the Corrèze department

References

Communes of Corrèze
Corrèze communes articles needing translation from French Wikipedia